Travis Lee (born 1983) is a former NCAA wrestler at the 125 lbs and 133 lbs weight class from Cornell University, where he competed for the Cornell Big Red wrestling team under coach Rob Koll. Lee was the first individual NCAA wrestling champion from Hawaii, winning titles in 2003 and 2005 at 125 lbs and 133 lbs, respectively.

Background and wrestling career
Lee's first sport was judo, in which he won national junior titles. As a wrestler he won three Hawaii state high-school championships and the 2001 junior national titles in freestyle and Greco-Roman wrestling. His collegiate record was 143–13, the most wins of any Cornell wrestler. He won the Eastern Intercollegiate Wrestling Association conference title four times, and was the Ivy League Rookie of the Year and a two-time Wrestler of the Year. He won the 2003 and 2005 NCAA wrestling championships, losing in the semi-final in 2004, and came back from injury to win the Dave Schultz Memorial International in February 2007 with the New York Athletic Club. A further injury at the Independence Cup in Tashkent, Uzbekistan the following month led Lee to retire from wrestling.

Personal life
Lee is from Liliha, Honolulu, and he graduated from Saint Louis School, Honolulu. He graduated in biological and environmental engineering from Cornell in 2005, and gained a master's degree in Engineering in 2006. At Cornell, he was also a member of the Quill and Dagger society. After he graduated he helped coach the Cornell wrestling team and the Finger Lakes Wrestling Club. He worked at Kionix as a bioengineer in 2007. He is now an automation engineer at Zymergen.

References

External links
Saint Louis Alumni Associati on News profile
Former website (also on the Internet Archive)

1983 births
Living people
Sportspeople from Honolulu
Cornell University College of Engineering alumni
American male sport wrestlers
American bioengineers